John Alexander Vincent Bates (1918-1993) was an English neurophysiologist based at the National Hospital for Nervous Diseases from 1946 until his retirement. He became the chief electroencephalographer at the hospital, studying human EEG in relation to voluntary movement. In 1949 he founded the Ratio Club, a dining club of British scientists interested in cybernetics.

Papers relating to Bates and the Ratio Club are held at the Wellcome Library.

References

1918 births
1993 deaths
English neuroscientists
Neurophysiologists